Rhydowen is a small village in Ceredigion in south-west Wales.

It has a population of about 347, of which around 200 are Welsh-speaking.

The village hall, established in 1917, has been recently demolished, despite local protest. The hall, declared derelict in 1973 after falling into disrepair due to lack of use, or indeed maintenance, had undergone several attempts at restoration; but any future efforts were deemed too costly.

External links
Photos of Rhydowen and surrounding area at geograph.org.uk

Villages in Ceredigion
Llandysul